Fred Louis Wham (June 15, 1884 – February 2, 1967) was a United States district judge of the United States District Court for the Eastern District of Illinois.

Education and career

Born in Marion County, Illinois, Wham received a Bachelor of Laws from the University of Illinois College of Law in 1909. He was in private practice in Fort Smith and Fayetteville, Arkansas from 1909 to 1915. He was an Assistant Solicitor in the United States Department of Agriculture in Washington, D.C. from 1915 to 1917. He was in private practice in Centralia, Illinois from 1917 to 1927.

Federal judicial service

On February 26, 1927, Wham was nominated by President Calvin Coolidge to a seat on the United States District Court for the Eastern District of Illinois vacated by Judge George W. English. Wham was confirmed by the United States Senate on March 1, 1927, and received his commission the same day. He served as Chief Judge from 1949 to 1956, assuming senior status on March 3, 1956, and serving in that capacity until his death on February 2, 1967.

References

Sources
 

1884 births
1967 deaths
Judges of the United States District Court for the Eastern District of Illinois
United States district court judges appointed by Calvin Coolidge
20th-century American judges
People from Marion County, Illinois
University of Illinois College of Law alumni
Arkansas lawyers
Illinois lawyers